Peter Crawley (born 4 January 1969) is an English cricketer. He played four first-class matches for Cambridge University Cricket Club in 1992.

See also
 List of Cambridge University Cricket Club players

References

External links
 

1969 births
Living people
English cricketers
Cambridge University cricketers
People from Newton-le-Willows